Feminist metaphysics aims to question how inquiries and answers in the field of metaphysics have supported sexism. Feminist metaphysics overlaps with fields such as the philosophy of mind and philosophy of self. Feminist metaphysicians such as Sally Haslanger, Ásta, and Judith Butler have sought to explain the nature of gender in the interest of advancing feminist goals. Philosophers such as Robin Dembroff and Talia Mae Bettcher have sought to explain the genders of transgender and non-binary people.

Social construction 
Simone de Beauvoir was the first feminist theorist to distinguish sex from gender, as is suggested by her famous line, “One is not born, but rather becomes, a woman.” In her seminal work The Second Sex, de Beauvoir argues that, although biological features distinguish men and women, these features neither cause nor justify the social conditions which disadvantage women. Since de Beauvoir, many feminists have argued that constructed categories re-enforce social hierarchies because they appear to be natural. Later theorists such as Judith Butler would challenge de Beauvoir's commitment to the pre-social existence of sex, arguing that sex is socially constructed as well as gender. Feminist metaphysics has thus challenged the apparent naturalness of both sex and gender.

Another aim of feminist metaphysics has been to provide a basis for feminist activism by explaining what unites women as a group. These accounts have historically centered on cisgender women, but more recent accounts have sought to include transgender women as well. Robin Dembroff has introduced a metaphysical account of non-binary genders.

References

Further reading 
 Battersby, Christine. The Phenomenal Woman: Feminist Metaphysics and the Patterns of Identity. New York: Routledge, 1998.  
 Howell, Nancy R. A Feminist Cosmology: Ecology, Solidarity, and Metaphysics. Amherst, N.Y.: Humanity Books, 2000.  
 Raschke, Debrah. Modernism, Metaphysics, and Sexuality. Selinsgrove: Susquehanna University Press, 2006.  
 Witt, Charlotte. Feminist Metaphysics Explorations in the Ontology of Sex, Gender and the Self. Dordrecht: Springer, 2010.  
 Schües, Christina, Dorothea Olkowski, and Helen Fielding. Time in Feminist Phenomenology. Bloomington: Indiana University Press, 2011.  
 Witt, Charlotte. The Metaphysics of Gender. New York: Oxford University Press, 2011.  

Feminist philosophy
Feminist theory
Metaphysical theories